John "Jack" Dunne (1857–?) was an Irish hurler who played for the Tipperary senior team.

Dunne made his first appearance for the team during the inaugural championship of 1887. During that successful year he won one All-Ireland medal.

At club level Dunne played with Gortnahoe–Glengoole. Dunne also made that.

References

1858 births
Gortnahoe-Glengoole hurlers
Tipperary inter-county hurlers
All-Ireland Senior Hurling Championship winners
Year of death missing